The men's marathon at the 1946 European Athletics Championships was held in Oslo, Norway, on 22 August 1946.

Medalists

Results
It is reported that the event was held on a short course measuring only 40.1 kilometres.  Therefore, the winning time is no new championship record.

Final
22 August

Participation
According to an unofficial count, 17 athletes from 11 countries participated in the event.

 (1)
 (2)
 (1)
 (2)
 (1)
 (2)
 (2)
 (1)
 (2)
 (1)
 (2)

References

Marathon
Marathons at the European Athletics Championships
Euro
1946 European Athletics
Men's marathons